The  is a toll road in Osaka Prefecture. It is owned and operated by the West Nippon Expressway Company (NEXCO West Japan). The route is signed E90 under Ministry of Land, Infrastructure, Transport and Tourism's  "2016 Proposal for Realization of Expressway Numbering."

Route description

The road is a short connector route linking Hanshin Expressway Route 4 with the Hanwa Expressway.

Osaka Prefecture Route 36 serves as an access road to the toll road.

History
After opening, the Sakai Senboku  Road was managed by the Osaka Prefecture Road Corporation, but on 1 April 2018 the management of the road was transferred to the West Nippon Expressway Company.

Junction list
The entire expressway is in Osaka Prefecture. TB - toll gate

|colspan="8" style="text-align: center;"|Through to  Hanshin Expressway Route 4

References

External links 
 West Nippon Expressway Company

Toll roads in Japan
Roads in Osaka Prefecture